Chimalpilli may refer to:

Chimalpilli I, the first king of Ecatepec
Chimalpilli II